Minghetti is a surname. Notable people with the surname include:

Angelo Minghetti (1822–1885), Italian ceramist and painter
Marco Minghetti (1818–1886), Italian economist and statesman
Prospero Minghetti (1786–1853), Italian painter

Italian-language surnames